The next Gibraltar general election will elect all 17 members to the 5th Gibraltar Parliament.

Timing and procedure
Under section 38(2) of the Gibraltar Constitution Order 2006, the parliament must be dissolved four years after its first meeting following the last election (unless the Chief Minister advises the Governor of Gibraltar to dissolve parliament sooner). Under section 37 of the Constitution, writs for a general election must be issued within thirty days of the dissolution and the general election must then be held no later than three months after the issuing of a writ.

With the first meeting of the current parliament taking place on 30 October 2019, parliament must be dissolved before midnight on 29 October 2023, writs must be issued by 28 November 2023 and an election must take place before 28 February 2024. However, if recent precedent is followed, the Chief Minister is likely to ask the Governor for an early dissolution and an election to take place sometime in October 2023 (four years after the last election). Following the British tradition, elections conventionally take place on a Thursday.

Incumbent members

References

General elections in Gibraltar
Future elections in Gibraltar